Ilian Stoyanov (born 20 January 1977) is a former Bulgarian football defender. In Bulgaria he is also known as Collovati, because of his haircut in the past, reminiscent of that of former Italian midfielder Fulvio Collovati.

Career
He was part of the Bulgarian 2004 European Football Championship team, who exited in the first round, finishing bottom of Group C, having finished top of Qualifying Group 8 in the pre-tournament phase. In the beginning of his career, he played as left-back.

He started his professional career with CSKA Sofia in 1995. However, Stoyanov made a name for himself with Velbazhd Kyustendil and Levski Sofia, appearing in more than 150 matches in the top division. During his time in Bulgarian football, he established himself as a capable defender, but was also notable for displaying a fiery temper on occasions and was involved in a number of controversial incidents, including an altercation with a referee and remarks uttered at black footballers, which invited accusations of racism.

He joined JEF United Chiba in 2005 from Levski Sofia and enjoyed a reasonably successful first season, helping them lift the Yamazaki Nabisco Cup (the Japanese League Cup), the club's first ever trophy - and also to repeat the achievement the following season, 2006. The club released him in July 2007 after he criticised manager Amar Osim. On 12 August 2007, he signed with another Japanese club Sanfrecce Hiroshima. He could not help the team to avoid relegation to J2 in the same season. However, he helped his new team to get to the final of the Emperor's Cup in 2007, and to win the Xerox Super Cup in 2008.

In 2009, he returned to Bulgaria national team and started 7 games in 2010 FIFA World Cup qualification.

After his retirement, Stoyanov has started his own business in Japan and is also involved in a football academy.

Club statistics

National team statistics

Honors

Levski Sofia
Bulgarian League – 2001, 2002
Bulgarian Cup – 2002, 2003, 2005

JEF United Chiba
J.League Cup – 2005, 2006
J. League Best Eleven – 2005

Sanfrecce Hiroshima
Xerox Super Cup – 2008
J2 League – 2008

Personal life
 He is a friend of Bulgarian sumo wrestler Kotooshu Katsunori who became the first European to win the top division championship, Makuuchi.

References

External links

 
 

1977 births
Living people
Bulgarian footballers
Bulgaria international footballers
Bulgarian expatriate footballers
First Professional Football League (Bulgaria) players
J1 League players
J2 League players
Expatriate footballers in Japan
Bulgarian expatriate sportspeople in Japan
PFC CSKA Sofia players
PFC Velbazhd Kyustendil players
PFC Levski Sofia players
JEF United Chiba players
Sanfrecce Hiroshima players
Fagiano Okayama players
UEFA Euro 2004 players
People from Kyustendil
Association football defenders
Sportspeople from Kyustendil Province